Graeme Hawkins (born 20 February 1962) is a New Zealand wrestler. He competed at the 1982 Commonwealth Games and the men's freestyle 57 kg at the 1984 Summer Olympics.

References

External links
 

1962 births
Living people
New Zealand male sport wrestlers
Olympic wrestlers of New Zealand
Wrestlers at the 1984 Summer Olympics
Sportspeople from Wellington City
Wrestlers at the 1982 Commonwealth Games
Commonwealth Games competitors for New Zealand
20th-century New Zealand people
21st-century New Zealand people